The 1974–75 IHL season was the 30th season of the International Hockey League, a North American minor professional league. 11 teams participated in the regular season, and the Toledo Goaldiggers won the Turner Cup.

Regular season

Turner Cup-Playoffs

External links 
 Season 1974/75 on hockeydb.com

IHL
International Hockey League (1945–2001) seasons